Camille Walala (born 1975 as Camille Vic-Dupont), is a French multi-disciplinary designer based in London, United Kingdom, best known for her life-size murals and installations as well as her post-modernism inspired patterns.

Life and career 

Camille Walala was born in Provence, France, moved to the United Kingdom at the age of 23, and later studied textile design at the University of Brighton. In 2009, she established Studio Walala in East London.

In 2017, Walala was invited by NOW Gallery in South London to create an interactive, life size installation, for which the studio created an immersive so-called "temple of wonder".

In 2021, during a period of lockdown due to the COVID-19 pandemic, Walala reimagined the Design Museum shop as a grocery store, selling essential products re-designed by emerging artists such as Kentaro Okawara, Joey Yu, Isadora Lima and Michaela Yearwood-Dan.

Selected work 
 WALALA X PLAY, NOW Gallery, London, United Kingdom, 2017
 Walala Lounge, London Design Festival, 2019
 Captivated By Colour , for the first London Mural Festival, London, United Kingdom, 2020
 House of Dots, for Lego, Coal Drops Yard, London, United Kingdom, 2020
Supermarket, Design Museum, London, United Kingdom, 2021
 Official poster design for Montreux Jazz Festival 2022

References

External links 

People from Provence
1975 births
Living people
21st-century French women artists
French installation artists
French muralists
French expatriates in the United Kingdom
Alumni of the University of Brighton